The 1951 Cal Aggies football team represented the College of Agriculture at Davis—now known as the University of California, Davis—as a member of the Far Western Conference (FWC) during the 1951 college football season. Led by third-year head coach Ted Forbes, the Aggies compiled an overall record of 5–4 with a mark of 3–1 in conference play, winning the FWC title. The Cal Aggies outscored their opponents 175 to 160 for the season. They played home games at Aggie Field in Davis, California.

Schedule

Notes

References

Cal Aggies
UC Davis Aggies football seasons
Northern California Athletic Conference football champion seasons
Cal Aggies football